WWE Unforgiven was an annual professional wrestling pay-per-view (PPV) event produced by World Wrestling Entertainment (WWE), a Connecticut-based professional wrestling promotion. It was first held as the 21st In Your House PPV in April 1998. Unforgiven returned as its own PPV in September 1999 and continued as the annual September PPV until the final event in 2008. From its first event up through the 2001 event, the PPV was held when the promotion was still called the World Wrestling Federation (WWF).

Unforgiven: In Your House was notable for featuring the very first Inferno match, as well as the first evening gown match. After WWE introduced the brand extension in 2002, Unforgiven from 2003 to 2006 was held exclusively for the Raw brand. Following WrestleMania 23 in April 2007, brand-exclusive PPVs were discontinued, thus the 2007 and 2008 events also featured the SmackDown and ECW brands. In 2009, Unforgiven was discontinued and replaced by Breaking Point.

History
Unforgiven was first held as an In Your House pay-per-view (PPV) event. In Your House was a series of monthly PPVs first produced by the World Wrestling Federation (WWF, now WWE) in May 1995. They aired when the promotion was not holding one of its major PPVs and were sold at a lower cost. Unforgiven: In Your House was the 21st In Your House event and took place on April 26, 1998, at the Greensboro Coliseum Complex in Greensboro, North Carolina. This inaugural Unforgiven event was notable for introducing the Inferno match, as well as the first evening gown match.

After the In Your House branding was retired following February 1999's St. Valentine's Day Massacre: In Your House, Unforgiven branched off as its own PPV that September. Unforgiven then continued as the promotion's annual September PPV until 2008. After the 2008 event, Unforgiven was discontinued and replaced by Breaking Point in 2009.

In May 2002, the WWF was renamed to World Wrestling Entertainment (WWE) as a result of a lawsuit from the World Wildlife Fund over the "WWF" initialism. Also around this time, the promotion held a draft that split its roster into two distinctive brands of wrestling, Raw and SmackDown!, where wrestlers exclusively performed—a third brand, ECW, was added in 2006. To coincide with the brand extension, Unforgiven was held exclusively for wrestlers of the Raw brand from 2003 to 2006. Following WrestleMania 23 in April 2007, WWE discontinued brand-exclusive PPVs, thus the 2007 and 2008 events featured wrestlers from the Raw, SmackDown, and ECW brands.

Events

See also
List of WWE pay-per-view events

References

External links
Official website

 
Recurring events established in 1998
Recurring events disestablished in 2008

ko:언포기븐